The Sebuí Private Natural Heritage Reserve is a private natural heritage reserve in the state of Paraná, Brazil.

Location

The Sebuí Private Natural Heritage Reserve  is in the municipality of Guaraqueçaba, Paraná.
The reserve is on the coast of Paraná, accessible only by boat.
The journey takes 50 minutes from the town of Guaraqueçaba, and the reserve may also be reached from Paranaguá.
The reserve is in one of the largest estuaries of the South Atlantic, containing about 60 islands.
It houses traditional communities with a rich culture.

The Sebuí Private Natural Heritage Reserve was created by ordnance on 25 November 1999, modified on 3 February 2000.
The name "Sebuí" comes from the Guarani language word for "earthworm", referring to the creatures that live there and to the sinuosity of one of the rivers.
The reserve is part of the Lagamar Mosaic:

Environment

The reserve protects an area of Atlantic Forest.
More than 70% of the forest is in its primary state, and has never been affected by human activity.
91 species of birds have been seen, about 20 of amphibians, 15 of fish, 10 of reptiles and several of mammals.
The reserve is home to vulnerable red-tailed amazon (Amazona brasiliensis).

Activities

The Sebuí Private Natural Heritage Reserve  is run commercially, providing tourist packages that include an interpretative forest trail, waterfall and kayaks.
Visitors may bathe in the rivers or falls.
Walks lead along the mangroves and the banks of the Velho, Sebuí and Quatro Quedas rivers.
Trips may be arranged from the reserve to the Superagüi National Park, to see the parrots on the Ilha dos Pinheiros, and to Maruja Beach in the state of São Paulo.

Notes

Sources

Private natural heritage reserves of Brazil
Protected areas of Paraná (state)
1999 establishments in Brazil